Nebo, Ystrad Rhondda was the first Baptist chapel in the Rhondda Valleys.  Founded in 1786, and known as Ynysfach,  its first minister was one Thomas Edwards. The name was changed to Nebo in the early part of the nineteenth century.

Nebo was the mother church to numerous other chapels in the valley including Hebron, Ton Pentre in 1868,  and Noddfa, Treorchy which subsequently became much larger than Nebo in terms of membership.

With the industrialisation of the valley it was rebuilt and extended in 1857 and again in 1876. Its membership peaked at 318 in 1905, in the immediate aftermath of the Welsh Revival. By 1940 the membership had fallen to 132, with a further sharp decline to 62 by 1945. Garfield Eynon became Nebo's last minister in 1953 and the church was without a minister after his departure in 1962. Nebo closed in the early 1980s and the chapel was subsequently demolished. A short portion of the boundary wall and fence remains in situ.

Some housing was later built adjacent to the site, which was named Nebo Estate.

References

Chapels in Rhondda Cynon Taf
Demolished buildings and structures in Wales